Holcocera gigantella is a moth in the family Blastobasidae. It is found in the United States, including Colorado, Arizona and California.

The wingspan is about 22 mm.

The larvae feed on the seeds and pods of Yucca species.

References

Moths described in 1876
gigantella